John Terpstra (born in Brockville, Ontario) is a Canadian poet and carpenter.

During much of his childhood, he lived in Edmonton, Alberta, but moved back to Ontario to attend high school in Hamilton, where he lives today.

Released a spoken-word recording of his poems in 2000, called "Nod Me In, Shake Me Out", with composer, arranger and producer Bart Nameth, violinist Hugh Marsh, and others.

Education
 Trinity Christian College, Chicago
 University of Toronto

Awards and recognition
 1988: Bressani Prize, "Forty Days and Forty Nights"
 1992: CBC Radio Literary Competition, "Captain Kintail"
 2004: poetry finalist, Governor General's Awards, Disarmament
 2006: finalist, Charles Taylor Prize, BC Award for Canadian Non-fiction, The Boys, or Waiting for the Electrician's Daughter

Bibliography
 1982: Scrabbling for Repose (Split Reed)
 1987: Forty Days and Forty Nights (Netherlandic) 
 1990: Naked Trees (Netherlandic) 
 1992: Captain Kintail (Netherlandic) 
 1997: The Church Not Made With Hands (Wolsak and Wynn) 
 1998: Devil's Punch Bowl (St Thomas Poetry Series) 
 2000: Restoration (Gaspereau) 
 2002: Falling Into Place (Gaspereau) 
 2003: Disarmament (Gaspereau) 
 2005: Brendan Luck (Gaspereau) 
 2005: The Boys, or, Waiting for the Electrician's Daughter (Gaspereau) 
 2006: Two or Three Guitars: Selected Poems (Gaspereau) 
2012: Naked Trees (Wolsak and Wynn)  
2014: This Orchard Sound (Wolsak and Wynn) 
2016: In the Company of All (St Thomas Poetry Series)  
2018: Daylighting Chedoke: Exploring Hamilton's Hidden Creek (Wolsak and Wynn) 
2020: Wild Hope: Prayers & Poems (St Thomas Poetry Series)

External links
 Image Journal: John Terpstra, September 2000, accessed 21 July 2006
 League of Canadian Poets: John Terpstra, accessed 21 July 2006

Year of birth missing (living people)
Living people
20th-century Canadian poets
Canadian male poets
Writers from Edmonton
Writers from Ontario
People from Brockville
University of Toronto alumni
21st-century Canadian poets
20th-century Canadian male writers
21st-century Canadian male writers